Uclesia varicornis is a species of bristle fly in the family Tachinidae. It is found in North America.

Distribution
United States.

References

Dexiinae
Insects described in 1927
Taxa named by Charles Howard Curran
Diptera of North America